Bizarra Locomotiva is a Portuguese industrial metal band. Its history dates back to 1993, when Armando Teixeira (vocals and machinery) and Rui Sidónio (vocals) started a band to participate in Modern Music Competition of the city of Lisbon.

After participating in the Biennale of Young Creators of Mediterranean Europe, the Bizarra Locomotiva went in a national tour. In August 1997, the band performed the in Southwest Festival promoting Fear Now?. In Bestiario, 1998, the band highlights a wider musical range, welcoming new environments and sounds. In 2002, Homem Maquina, mankind once again was the subject of fierce criticism. The band members dressed in suits symbolizing the human machine. In 2004 the band released Ódio, a comeback to the raw and heavy sounds that were not at present in Homem Máquina and by that the arc of themed based records came to an end. After five years the band released Álbum Negro which gained attention from the media and had positive reviews, this record features Fernando Ribeiro from Moonspell as guest vocals in the song O Anjo Exilado. Years later, and touring with Álbum Negro the band completed its 20th anniversary, with a few shows to celebrate it and a video documentary. The album Mortuário came right after. Released in 2015, the band then toured around Portugal.

Discography
 Bizarra Locomotiva, Simbiose Records, 1994.
 First Crime, Then Live, Simbiose Records, 1995.
 Fear Now?, Simbiose Records, 1996.
 Bestiário, Simbiose Records, 1998.
 "XX Anos XX Bandas", (Comp.) (tribute to Xutos & Pontapés) EMI Records, 1998
 Homem Máquina, Metrodiscos 2002.
 Ódio, Metrodiscos, 2004.
 Álbum Negro, Raging Planet, 2009.
 Mortuário, Rastilho Records, 2015

Current members
Rui Sidónio - vocals
Miguel Fonseca - guitars
Alpha - synths and bass 
Rui Berton - drums

Past members
Armando Teixeira - vocals, samples
Ernesto Pinto - drums
Marco Franco - drums
BJ - synths

References

External links
Various - XX Anos , XX Bandas - Tributo Aos Xutos E Pontapés : Discogs.com

Portuguese musical groups